Long Island is a small island in the Sacramento–San Joaquin River Delta. It is part of Sacramento County, California. It appears on 1978 USGS maps of the area.

References

Islands of Sacramento County, California
Islands of the Sacramento–San Joaquin River Delta
Islands of Northern California